Steam traction was the predominant form of motive power used by the Deutsche Reichsbahn on its narrow-gauge railways. For certain duties diesel locomotives were also used, albeit these were usually second-hand or rebuilt engines.

From 1970 they were incorporated into Class 100 without regard to their gauge. This applied to all Kleinlokomotiven and they were given serial numbers from 901ff.. Due to the risk of confusion, in 1973 the narrow-gauge diesel locomotives were reclassified to 199. In addition, from 1992 they became DBAG Class 399; and once more the gauge was deducible from the serial number as follows:  = 399.1,  = 399.6,  = 399.7.

1949–1970

Heeresfeldbahnlokomotive HF 130 C 

Two former three-axled Heeresfeldbahnloks of Type HF 130 C were refurbished by the DR for various  narrow-gauge lines. They were given the numbers Köf 6001 and 6003, the first was deployed to Dahme, the second to Nauen.
Following the dismantling of the Nauen line in 1963 it, too, went to Dahme. When that line closed in 1965 both locomotives were transferred to Rügen. Köf 6001 (from 1970: 100 901 and from 1973: 199 001) was retired in 1985, the other one (from 1970: 100 902 and from 1973: 199 002), last used by the DR as no. 399 703 and is still in service today under its old number of Kö 6003.

BMAG FD 80 

She had three axles, all coupled, and a centrally positioned driver's cab. On one side was the engine, on the other the  mechanical four-geared drive which drove the axles. It was mainly used as a shunter in Burg station.
In the Reichsbahn she was given the number Kö 6002. She was retired in 1962.

Kö 6004 

A twin-axled former pit locomotive from the Heeresfeldbahn fleet, built in 1944 at Klöckner-Humboldt-Deutz, which was stored after the war at Dahme. It was renovated in 1959 for use at RAW Dessau, the main change being a larger driver's cab. The axles were driven via a gear train and roller chains. In 1967 she was sold to Pretzien to the Ballerstedt Transport KG, where she hauled gravel trains until 1980.

LKM Type Ns 3 

During the 1950s, VEB Lokomotivbau Karl Marx in Babelsberg built diesel locomotives for industrial and field railways, which were also suited to various (narrow) gauge uses (s = Schmalspur or narrow gauge). The first engines of Type Ns 3 were delivered in 1952. A total of 280 locomotives of this class were built. The locomotive drive was achieved by means of a mechanical, three-stage gear train with friction clutch via a jackshaft lying between the axles and connecting rods to the axles. The locos were with equipped with water-cooled, four-cylinder, four-stroke diesel engines generating a nominal 60 horsepower.

They had an outside frame, the drive was achieved using a mechanical, three-stage gear and a reverse gear unit. The axles were driven by connecting rods via a jackshaft. The Treibzapfen and crank pins were located outside the frame.

One locomotive of Type Ns 3 with a gauge of  ended up at Rügen, where it was initially used in the Stubben Chalk Factory and, from 1954, on the Rügen Railways as Kö 6005 for shunting duties. On the withdrawal of goods services she was stored in 1970.

Two metre-gauge examples of this class were originally built for the Soviet Army and ended up in the Industriebahn Halle in 1965 where they were used to shunt the sidings. They had numbers Kö 6501 and 6502. The first was initially used from 1963 to 1965 in Barth on the Franzburg lines. The technically identical locomotives only differed in appearance: The second was given a 2800 mm wide driver's cab, so that the vision when shunting with standard-gauge wagons was better. Instead of a buffer this locomotive had a long coupling rod (Kuppelbaum) for rollbock work.

They were renumbered in 1970 to 100 903 and 904, and in 1973 to 199 003 and 004. In 1983/1984 they were retired. Shortly beforehand they had been given the numbers 199 991 and 992 to distinguish them from their successors.

From 1970 

The remaining Kleinloks, Kö 6001, 6003, 6501 and 6502, were incorporated as Class 199.0.
They were joined by other locomotives:

LKM Type Ns 4 

The most powerful locomotive of the first LKM type had a power output of 90 horsepower (90 PS). In 1954 two prototypes of the Ns 4 were built for were for export to Hungary. In 1955 18 locomotives were built for Indonesia with the type designation of Ns 4 a. There is still at least one locomotive of Type Ns 4 a in Indonesia today. Production of the Ns 4 b did not begin until 1957. Twenty-two units were manufactured from 1957 to 1958. Four examples remain in Germany. Of the outside frame series from the year 1958, at least two of the locomotives had the new superstructure, although certainly not all of them. Whether this intermediate series should be designated as Ns 4 b or Ns 4 c is not absolutely clear.

In the DR there were at least 3 locomotives of Type Ns 4 b, of which all have survived. Their histories are given below.

199 007 
The DR bought locomotive no. 250029/1957 from VEB Feinspinnerei Venusberg in 1972 and deployed it until 1991 in Wilischtal on the industrial line of the paper factory, VEB Papierfabrik Wilischthal (Thumer Netz).
It was given no. 199 007. In 1992 it was sold to the Preßnitz Valley Railway Society.

199 008 
In 1970 they sold it to the VEB Gießerei foundry and engineering works of "Ferdinand Kunert" (GISAG) at Schmiedeberg and operated it as loco no. 2 on the factory siding. In 1987 they sold it to the DR who and used it as "199 008", later as "399 702" for various tasks include the dismantling of the Preßnitz Valley Railway and on the industrial railway of the paper factory, VEB Papierfabrik Wilischtal. In 1993 it was sold to the Döllnitz Valley Railway.

199 103 
In 1983 the DR bought it for the "Berline Pioneer Railway" (Pioniereisenbahn Berlin, today the Berlin Park Railway). It was given the designation  199 103.

LKM V 10 C 

The locomotives of Type V 10 C were further developed by LKM Babelsberg from the Ns 4, production of which had ceased in 1958. The first engines were delivered in 1959. They inherited the drive concept from the Ns 4, which was achieved once again via a jack axle under the driver's cab with coupling rods to the axles. Once again four gears were provided. On locomotives up to  gauge the axles had an outside frame, on larger gauges they had an inside frame.
The engines were equipped with air-cooled diesel engines, 6 KVD 14.5 SRL generating , made by the VEB Diesel Engineering Works at Schönebeck.

Two , metre-gauge, examples of this type, built in 1964, initially in service in Gotha at an industrial firm, went to the Spreewald Railway in 1970. There they were given numbers 100 905 and 906; from 1973: 199 005 and 006.
Later they went to the Harz Narrow Gauge Railways. They were retired in 1991 but were given, on paper at least, numbers 399 112 and 113. No. 199 005 is now with the Harz Narrow Gauge Railways Society.

Two  locos of this type used on the Berlin Park Railway in Berlin (formerly the Pioniereisenbahn Wuhlheide) were numbered as 199 101 and 102 in DR vehicle fleet.

Kö II 

Existing locomotives of Type Kö II and Kb II were re-gauged and reclassified for shunting duties on  lines.

 199 003II, regauged in 1983 in RAW Halle, ex 100 128, from 1992 renumbered to 399 110, mustered out in 1992. This loco comes from a series of Köf remakes that were built in RAW Dessau in the 1960–1962 (Kö 4001 to 4032). 
 199 004II, regauged in 1983 in RAW Halle, ex 100 287, from 1992 renumbered to 399 111, mustered out 1992. 
Both locomotives were substitutes for the Ns 3 on the Halle industrial line. After its closure, both locos were stored for years on a flat wagon, which was stabled in Bw Halle G, and finally ended up in the Harz, from there it went in 2006 to BSW Gruppe Traditionsgemeinschaft Bw Halle P e. V., Halle: "199 003-5" and "199 004-3". Since 11 June 2007, no. 199 003 has belonged to the IG Hirzberg Railway and since 13 June has been based in Georgenthal.
 199 010: regauged in 1985, ex Kb 4325 bzw. 100 325, in service with the Harz Narrow Gauge Railways (in 1992 for a while as 399 114).
 199 011 and 012: regauged in 1991, ex Kö 4639 and 100 639 and Kb 4113 and 100 213, in service with the Harz Narrow Gauge Railways (in 1992 for a while as 399 115 and 399 116).

Remarks 
See also DR Class V 30 C and DR Class V 36.48, which were not used by the Reichsbahn as Kleinloks.

Sources 
 Horst J. Obermayer: Taschenbuch Deutsche Diesellokomotiven. Franckh, Stuttgart 1972, 
 Klaus Kieper, Reiner Preuß: Schmalspurbahnarchiv. transpress VEB Verlag for Verkehrswesen, Berlin 1980.
also under the title:
 Klaus Kieper, Reiner Preuß: Schmalspur zwischen Ostsee und Erzgebirge, Alba Buchverlag, Düsseldorf 1980,

External links 
 The V 10 C at Freundeskreis Selketalbahn
 The narrow-gauge Kö at Freundeskreis Selketalbahn

Narrow gauge steam locomotives of Germany
 
600 mm gauge railway locomotives